Mamadu Iaia Djaló (c. 1962 – 20 December 2021) was a Guinea-Bissau politician, and the founder and leader of the New Democracy Party.

Political career
Running as an independent presidential candidate in the 2005 presidential election, Djaló finished sixth out of thirteen presidential candidates, receiving 1.59% of the vote. In 2007, he founded the New Democracy Party, and contested the 2009 presidential elections, in which he finished fourth out of eleven candidates, with 3.11% of the vote. He did not contest the 2012 presidential elections, but in 2014 general elections he finished fifth out of thirteen with 4.56% of the vote and his party won one seat in parliament.

In April 2018 he was appointed Minister of Justice and Human Rights. In a cabinet reshuffle in July 2019, he was appointed Minister of Commerce and Industry.

He contested the 2019 presidential elections, finishing eighth out of twelve candidates with 0.5% of the vote.

Personal life and death
After falling ill in Lomé, Togo, Djaló was transferred to Dakar, Senegal, where he died on 20 December 2021.

References

1960s births
2021 deaths
Year of birth missing
Place of birth missing
Government ministers of Guinea-Bissau
New Democracy Party (Guinea-Bissau) politicians